National Tertiary Route 320, or just Route 320 (or ) is a National Road Route of Costa Rica, located in the San José, Puntarenas provinces.

Description
In San José province the route covers Turrubares canton (Carara district).

In Puntarenas province the route covers Garabito canton (Tárcoles district).

References

Highways in Costa Rica